"Party People (Ignite the World)" is a song recorded by American singer and songwriter Erika Jayne. It reached number one on Billboards Hot Dance Club Play chart in 2011. "One Hot Pleasure" became Jayne's sixth number one single on the Hot Dance Club Play chart. The single's remixes were created by Jody den Broeder, Bimbo Jones, Hector Fonseca, Whiiite and Cory Enemy.

Critical reception 

Bradley Stern of Muumuse called Erika Jayne one of the newest "Kweens of the Dance Floor" and picked "Party People (Ignite the World)" as the hot club track of the week in December 2011. Stern praised the music video's "abundant hair flips and glittery Louboutins". Jamie Sward of Music Is My King Size Bed compared the sound of "Party People (Ignite the World)" to Cascada's "Evacuate the Dancefloor". Sward noted that "as soon as the single hit iTunes, it was destined to ignite the charts". Sward complimented Jayne's ability to carry the song with a combination of "sexuality, powerhouse club diva vocals, and sexy, fierce ferocity."

Background and composition 

The song was written and produced by Swedish producers and songwriters Andreas Carlsson and Niclas Kings. Carlsson's previous credits include Britney Spears, Celine Dion, Westlife, Bon Jovi, LeAnn Rimes, Lindsay Lohan and Carrie Underwood.

Music video 
The official music video for "Party People (Ignite the World)" was directed by Jayne's longtime collaborator and choreographer Mikey Minden.

Track listings and formats 

CD single
 "Party People (Ignite the World)" (Original Radio Edit) – 
 "Party People (Ignite the World)" (Original Extended) – 

CD single "The Remixes, Pt. 1 - EP"
 "Party People (Ignite the World)" (Bimbo Jones Remix) – 
 "Party People (Ignite the World)" (Bimbo Jones Dub) – 
 "Party People (Ignite the World)" (Jody den Broeder Club Remix) – 
 "Party People (Ignite the World)" (Jody den Broeder Dub) – 
 "Party People (Ignite the World)" (Hector Fonseca Remix) – 
 "Party People (Ignite the World)" (Hector Fonseca Dub) – 
 "Party People (Ignite the World)" (Cory Enemy Remix) – 
 "Party People (Ignite the World)" (Whiiite Remix) – 
 "Party People (Ignite the World)" (Whiiite Dub) – 

CD single "The Remixes, Pt. 2 - EP"
 "Party People (Ignite the World)" (Bimbo Jones Radio Edit) – 
 "Party People (Ignite the World)" (Jody den Broeder Radio Edit) – 
 "Party People (Ignite the World)" (Hector Fonseca Edit) – 
 "Party People (Ignite the World)" (Whiiite Radio Edit) – 
 "Party People (Ignite the World)" (Cory Enemy Radio Edit) –

Charts

Release history

See also 

List of number-one dance singles of 2011 (US)

References 

2011 singles
2011 songs
Songs written by Niclas Kings
Songs written by Andreas Carlsson
Songs written by Kalle Engström
Songs about parties